Khederabad or Khedrabad may refer to:

Khederabad, Chaharmahal and Bakhtiari
Khederabad, Kermanshah
Khederabad, Qom